Michael Fisher (1931–2021) is an English physicist.

Michael Fisher or Mike Fisher may also refer to:

Arts and entertainment
 Michael Fisher, American screenwriter whose works include the 1968 film Killers Three
 Mike Fisher, American musician, and with his brother Roger, a founding member of Heart
 Mike Fisher (Only Fools and Horses), a fictional character from the BBC comedy Only Fools and Horses
 Michael Fisher (The Passage), fictional character

Law and politics
 D. Michael Fisher (born 1944), American jurist, former attorney general of US state Pennsylvania
 Michael Fisher (lawyer) (1946–2015), British lawyer
 Michael Fisher (born 1965), American politician, member of the Vermont House of Representatives
 Michael J. Fisher, Chief of the United States Border Patrol

Sports
 Mike Fisher (American football) (born 1958), American football player
 Mike Fisher (racing driver) (born 1943), American Formula One driver
 Mike Fisher (soccer) (born 1975), American soccer player
 Mike Fisher (ice hockey) (born 1980), Canadian ice hockey player

Religion
 Michael Fisher (Anglican bishop) (1918–2003), Brother Michael, Bishop suffragan of St Germans
 Michael William Fisher (born 1958), American Roman Catholic bishop

See also 
 Michael Fischer (disambiguation)
 Michoel Fisher (1910–2004), Russian Orthodox rabbi